Luna Alcalay (21 October 1928 – 9 October 2012) was a Croatian-born Austrian pianist, music educator and composer.

Biography
Alcalay was born in Zagreb, Croatia to a Jewish family. She studied piano under Bruno Seidlhofer and composition under Alfred Uhl at the Vienna Academy of Music and received a scholarship in 1958 to continue her studies in Rome. She attended the Darmstadt Summer Course. After completing her studies, she returned to Vienna, where she became a professor of piano at the Academy of Music and Performing Arts.

Composition prizes
 Darmstadt 1963 and 1964
 Gaudeamus competition 1967
 Berlin 1972
 International ISCM competition Italy 1973
 ORF Steiermark 1973
 "Preis der Stadt Wien" 1992

Works
Selected works include:

 Apostroph (violin solo)
 Apostrophen (violoncello solo)
 Gyroskop for viola solo (1998)
 un sogno à tre for flute, viola and harp (1990)
 relatif à la sonorité (string trio)
 Touches (two pianos)
 conversations à trois (woodwind trio)
 L'intérieur des pensées (string quartet)
 Applications (for sixteen strings)
 Pas de deux (two clarinets)
 Trio (alto saxophone, drums, double bass)
 Syntax (percussion)
 En circuit · Der alte Friedhof in Prag (mezzo-soprano and ensemble)
 Bagatellen (piano solo)
 Transparenzen(piano trio)
 Sentenzen (violin concerto)
 Quasi una Fantasia (violin and piano)
 Touches (piano concerto)
 Der übergangene Mensch (Music drama)
 A Game for Two (percussion (2 players))
 Due sentenze (mezzo-soprano, oboe d'amore, piano)
 3 poems (marimba)
 En passant (flute solo)
 Ich bin in sehnsucht eingehüllt ("I'm wrapped in longing"), Scenic reflections on love poems by Selma Meerbaum (1984), written for Gunda König and Dieter Kaufmann's K&K Experimental Studio for their series of performances called "Music and Eroticism - Amor, Terror, Psyche"

Alcalay's work has been recorded and issued on CD, including:
 Der Tod Des Trompeters/Heiligenlegende (Audio CD - Dec 1, 1995)
 Vienna Modern Masters VMM3020

References

Bibliography

External links
 
 Luna Alcalay - published works available from Edition HH

1928 births
2012 deaths
20th-century Austrian people
20th-century Croatian people
20th-century classical composers
Women classical composers
Jewish classical composers
Austrian classical composers
Croatian composers
Austrian classical pianists
Austrian women pianists
Croatian classical pianists
Women classical pianists
Austrian music educators
Piano pedagogues
Austrian Sephardi Jews
Croatian Sephardi Jews
Croatian emigrants to Austria
Musicians from Zagreb
Austrian people of Croatian-Jewish descent
20th-century classical pianists
Women music educators
Austrian women classical composers
20th-century women composers
20th-century women pianists